Ignashkino is a rural locality (a village) in Mikhaylovsky Selsoviet, Duvansky District, Bashkortostan, Russia. The population was 4 as of 2010. There is 1 street.

Geography 
Ignashkino is located 28 km west of Mesyagutovo (the district's administrative centre) by road. Mikhaylovka is the nearest rural locality.

References 

Rural localities in Duvansky District